Mizusawa Racecourse(Japanese: 水沢競馬場) is located in  Ōshū, Iwate Prefecture, Japan. It is the one of two racetracks located in Iwate Prefecture, alongside Morioka Racecourse.

Physical attributes

The track can be altered to fit races of 850m up to 2500m.

The admission fee is 200 yen. 

The racecourse is mostly used for local races, with bigger races usually being held at Morioka Racecourse.

Notable races

External links
 Official site

References

Horse racing venues in Japan
Sports venues in Iwate Prefecture
Ōshū, Iwate
Sports venues completed in 1901
1901 establishments in Japan